Sinurus is a genus of beetles in the family Carabidae, containing the following species:

 Sinurus graciliceps Bates, 1892
 Sinurus nitidus Bates, 1892
 Sinurus opacus Chaudoir, 1869

References

Lebiinae